The weasel program or Dawkins' weasel is a thought experiment and a variety of computer simulations illustrating it.  Their aim is to demonstrate that the process that drives evolutionary systems—random variation combined with non-random cumulative selection—is different from pure chance.

The thought experiment was formulated by Richard Dawkins, and the first simulation written by him; various other implementations of the program have been written by others.

Overview 
In chapter 3 of his book The Blind Watchmaker, Dawkins gave the following introduction to the program, referencing the well-known infinite monkey theorem:

The scenario is staged to produce a string of gibberish letters, assuming that the selection of each letter in a sequence of 28 characters will be random. The number of possible combinations in this random sequence is 2728, or about 1040, so the probability that the monkey will produce a given sequence is extremely low. Any particular sequence of 28 characters could be selected as a "target" phrase, all equally as improbable as Dawkins's chosen target, "METHINKS IT IS LIKE A WEASEL".

A computer program could be written to carry out the actions of Dawkins's hypothetical monkey, continuously generating combinations of 26 letters and spaces at high speed. Even at the rate of millions of combinations per second, it is unlikely, even given the entire lifetime of the universe to run, that the program would ever produce the phrase "METHINKS IT IS LIKE A WEASEL".

Dawkins intends this example to illustrate a common misunderstanding of evolutionary change, i.e. that DNA sequences or organic compounds such as proteins are the result of atoms randomly combining to form more complex structures. In these types of computations, any sequence of amino acids in a protein will be extraordinarily improbable (this is known as Hoyle's fallacy). Rather, evolution proceeds by hill climbing, as in adaptive landscapes.

Dawkins then goes on to show that a process of cumulative selection can take far fewer steps to reach any given target. In Dawkins's words:

By repeating the procedure, a randomly generated sequence of 28 letters and spaces will be gradually changed each generation. The sequences progress through each generation:

Generation 01: 
Generation 02:
Generation 10:
Generation 20:
Generation 30:
Generation 40:
Generation 43:

Dawkins continues:

Implications for biology
The program aims to demonstrate that the preservation of small changes in an evolving string of characters (or genes) can produce meaningful combinations in a relatively short time as long as there is some mechanism to select cumulative changes, whether it is a person identifying which traits are desirable (in the case of artificial selection) or a criterion of survival ("fitness") imposed by the environment (in the case of natural selection). Reproducing systems tend to preserve traits across generations, because the offspring inherit a copy of the parent's traits. It is the differences between offspring, the variations in copying, which become the basis for selection, allowing phrases closer to the target to survive, and the remaining variants to "die."

Dawkins discusses the issue of the mechanism of selection with respect to his "biomorphs" program:

Regarding the example's applicability to biological evolution, he is careful to point out that it has its limitations:

More complex models
In The Blind Watchmaker, Dawkins goes on to provide a graphical model of gene selection involving  entities he calls biomorphs. These are two-dimensional sets of line segments which bear relationships to each other, drawn under the control of "genes" that determine the appearance of the biomorph. By selecting entities from sequential generations of biomorphs, an experimenter can guide the evolution of the figures toward given shapes, such as "airplane" or "octopus" biomorphs.

As a simulation, the biomorphs are not much closer to the actual genetic behavior of biological organisms. Like the Weasel program, their development is shaped by an external factor, in this case the decisions of the experimenter who chooses which of many possible shapes will go forward into the following generation. They do however serve to illustrate the concept of "genetic space," where each possible gene is treated as a dimension, and the actual genomes of living organisms make up a tiny fraction of all possible gene combinations, most of which will not produce a viable organism. As Dawkins puts it, "however many ways there may be of being alive, it is certain that there are vastly more ways of being dead". 

In Climbing Mount Improbable, Dawkins responded to the limitations of the Weasel program by describing programs, written by other parties, that modeled the evolution of the spider web.  He suggested that these programs were more realistic models of the evolutionary process, since they had no predetermined goal other than coming up with a web that caught more flies through a "trial and error" process.  Spiderwebs were seen as good topics for evolutionary modeling because they were simple examples of biosystems that were easily visualized; the modeling programs successfully generated a range of spider webs similar to those found in nature.

Example algorithm 

Although Dawkins did not provide the source code for his program, a "Weasel" style algorithm could run as follows.

 Start with a random string of 28 characters.
 Make 100 copies of the string (reproduce).
 For each character in each of the 100 copies, with a probability of 5%, replace (mutate) the character with a new random character.
  Compare each new string with the target string "METHINKS IT IS LIKE A WEASEL", and give each a score (the number of letters in the string that are correct and in the correct position).
 If any of the new strings has a perfect score (28), halt. Otherwise, take the highest scoring string, and go to step 2.

For these purposes, a "character" is any uppercase letter, or a space. The number of copies per generation, and the chance of mutation per letter are not specified in Dawkins's book; 100 copies and a 5% mutation rate are examples. Correct letters are not "locked"; each correct letter may become incorrect in subsequent generations. The terms of the program and the existence of the target phrase do however mean that such 'negative mutations' will quickly be 'corrected'.

See also 
Genetic algorithm
Objections to evolution
Watchmaker analogy

References 
Dawkins, R. (1986) The Blind Watchmaker Oxford University Press.

External links 
 Many examples of Weasel programs in various computer languages
 The Weasel Applet (the "weasel program" written in Java)
 Dawkin's Weasel demo applet (in Monash University's Virtual Lab)
 Talk.origins claim CF011_1 Dawkins' WEASEL simulation
 An open sourced, HTML/Javascript web-based version by Damian Peterson
 An open sourced python script by Iddo Friedberg

Artificial life
Genetic algorithms
Richard Dawkins
Simulation software
Thought experiments